Sébastien Grosjean and Jo-Wilfried Tsonga were the defending champions, but were forced to withdraw due to a shoulder injury for Grosjean, before their quarterfinals match against Michaël Llodra and Andy Ram.

Michaël Llodra and Andy Ram won in the final 6–3, 5–7, [10–8], against Stephen Huss and Ross Hutchins.

Seeds

Draw

Draw

External links
 Main Draw

Doubles